The Sanitarium is a 1910 short comedy film featuring Fatty Arbuckle.

Cast
 Roscoe 'Fatty' Arbuckle - (as Roscoe Arbuckle)
 Nick Cogley
 George Hernandez

See also
 List of American films of 1910
 Fatty Arbuckle filmography

References

External links

1910 films
Silent American comedy films
1910 comedy films
1910 short films
American silent short films
American black-and-white films
American comedy short films
1910s American films
1910s English-language films